Hanford station is a train station in Hanford, California served by Amtrak. The station also services the larger city of Visalia, California,  to the east.

History 

It was built by the San Francisco and San Joaquin Valley Railroad in 1897 and is one of only three SF&SJV stations left in existence. Service by the Santa Fe Railroad ended on May 1, 1971; Amtrak service began in 1974.

In the early 1990s, the city sponsored a rehabilitation of the depot that included rebuilding the former freight section and enclosing the outdoor waiting room. A wide, curving canopy was added to the trackside façade to provide travelers with better protection from the sun and rain. Interior modifications resulted in a new layout that added office and commercial space.

In 2006, the city moved forward with $1.5 million in improvements to the adjacent bus bays that accommodate local and regional service provided by the Kings Area Regional Transit (KART) system. A circa 1880s Southern Pacific wooden freight depot was moved to the site to provide a waiting room and ticket desk for bus passengers.

References

External links 

Hanford, CA – Trainweb USA rail guide

Former Atchison, Topeka and Santa Fe Railway stations in California
Amtrak Thruway Motorcoach stations in Kings County, California
Railway stations in the United States opened in 1897
Amtrak stations in California
Railway stations in Kings County, California